Bruidegomskraal is a 99% Black African village in Dr Kenneth Kaunda District Municipality, North West Province, South Africa. It is situated north of Ventersdorp on the R30 road to Derby.

References

Populated places in the JB Marks Local Municipality